The Twelve Imams are the spiritual and political successors to the Islamic prophet Muhammad in the Twelver branch of Shia Islam, including that of the Alawite and Alevi.

According to Twelver theology, the Twelve Imams are exemplary human individuals who not only rule over the community with justice, but also are able to keep and interpret sharia and the esoteric meaning of the Quran. The words and deeds of Muhammad and the imams are a guide and model for the community to follow; as a result, they must be free from error and sin (known as ismah, or infallibility) and must be chosen by divine decree through the Prophet.

Imamah

It is believed in Twelver Shi’ism that the Islamic prophet Muhammad and his household are infallible, possessing Hikmah. Their oppression and suffering served greater purposes and were a means of divine grace to their devotees. The Imams are also guided by preserved texts in their possession, such as al-Jafr, al-Jamia, and unaltered past books the Torah and Injeel. Imamat, or belief in the divine guide, is a fundamental belief in the Twelver Shia doctrine and is based on the concept that God would not leave humanity without access to divine guidance.

According to Twelvers, there is at all times an Imam of the era who is the divinely appointed authority on all matters of faith and law in the Muslim community. Ali was the first of the Twelve Imams, and, in the Twelvers view, the rightful successor to Muhammad, followed by male descendants of Muhammad through his daughter Fatimah. Each Imam was the son of the previous Imam, with the exception of Al-Husayn, who was the brother of Al-Hasan. The twelfth and final Imam is Muhammad al-Mahdi, who is believed by the Twelvers to be currently alive, and hidden in the Major Occultation until he returns to bring justice to the world. It is believed by Twelver and Alevi Muslims that the Twelve Imams have been foretold in the Hadith of the 12 accomplishers. All of the Imams met unnatural deaths, with the exception of the last Imam who, according to Twelver and Alevi belief, is living in occultation.

Some of the Imams also have a leading role within some Sufi orders and are seen as the spiritual heads of Islam, because most of the Silsila (spiritual chain) of Sufi orders leads back to Muhammad through one of the Twelve Imams.

List

See also

Ahl al-Kisa
Succession to Muhammad
Hadith of the Twelve Successors
The Fourteen Infallibles
Islamic leadership
Salawat
Sayyidat Nisa al-Alamin

Footnotes

References

External links

 A brief introduction of Twelve Imams
 A Brief History Of The Lives Of The Twelve Imams a chapter of Shi'ite Islam by Allameh Tabatabaei
 The Twelve Imams Taken From "A Shi'ite Anthology" By Allameh Tabatabaei
 A Short History of the Lives of The Twelve Imams
 Hazreti Ali & the Twelve Imams – The Bektashi Order of Dervishes

Twelver theology
Lists of Islamic religious leaders
Imams